Charles Bates may refer to:
 Charles Bates (American football), American football coach
 Charles Bates (actor) (born 1935), American child actor
 Charles Loftus Bates (1871–1946), British Army officer
 Charles J. Bates (1930–2006), American food scientist 
 Charles W. Bates (1879–1929), American architect